The Soncco Formation is a Late Eocene to Early Oligocene geologic formation in southern Peru. The base of the formation at the contact with the K'ayra Formation is dated using fission track analysis at 43 Ma and the top, the contact with the Punacancha Formation, at 30 Ma. In other places the Tinajani Formation overlies the Soncco Formation.

Misattributed ornithopod tracks 
The formation was first dated to the Cretaceous, and fossil ornithopod tracks had been reported. Over 9,000 fossil tracks are said to be found within this formation. As the formation has been dated to the Paleogene, the tracks could not be attributed to dinosaurs.

References

Bibliography 
 
 
 
  

Geologic formations of Peru
Paleogene Peru
Eocene Series of South America
Oligocene Series of South America
Tinguirirican
Divisaderan
Mustersan
Rupelian Stage
Priabonian Stage
Conglomerate formations
Coal formations
Limestone formations
Sandstone formations
Lacustrine deposits
Fossiliferous stratigraphic units of South America
Paleontology in Peru
Geography of Cusco Region
Geography of Puno Region